Lucinda Dickey (born Lucinda Marie Henninger; July 9th, 1960) is an American former dancer and actress. She is best known for her leading role in the film Breakin' (1984) and its sequel Breakin' 2: Electric Boogaloo (1984).

Early life
Dickey was born and raised in Hutchinson, Kansas, where at the age of four, she began dancing in her mother's studio. While attending Kansas State University, she majored in dance and competed as Miss Manhattan/Kansas-State in the Miss Kansas pageant, where she won the talent division and finished third runner-up.

Career
In 1980, Dickey moved to Los Angeles and won a dance scholarship with the Roland DuPree Dance Academy. After 10 months, she became one of the lead dancers for the movie Grease 2. In fall 1982, she landed a stint as a dancer on Solid Gold.

Her first leading role was in Ninja III: The Domination, which premiered in 1984. In 1984, Dickey appeared in the role of jazz dancer turned breakdancer Kelly in Breakin' and its sequel, Breakin' 2: Electric Boogaloo. Next, Dickey played the mascot in the horror flick Cheerleader Camp, in 1988.

Dickey's last onscreen acting role was in the 1990 Perry Mason television movie, Perry Mason: The Case of the Defiant Daughter.

She appeared as a dance judge on TLC's 2008 series Master Of Dance.

Personal life
She retired from acting in 1990, and lives in California with her husband, Craig Piligian, a co-executive producer of, among his credits, the reality TV game show Survivor. They have two children, Joseph Michael (b. 1986) and Amanda Marie (b. 1989).

Filmography

See also
 List of dancers

References

External links
 
 

1960 births
Living people
People from Hutchinson, Kansas
Kansas State University alumni
Actresses from Kansas
American female dancers
American dancers
American film actresses
21st-century American women